Walking the Floor Over You is a box set of Ernest Tubb's early recordings, released in 1996. It is an eight-CD box set and was released in 1996. It contains 208 songs, many of them are previously unissued on LP or CD. The set includes extensive liner notes, session notes and photographs.

The collection covers Tubb's recordings from 1936 until early 1947. It ranges from Tubb accompanied only by his guitar to the developing of the roots of honkey tonk music.

Reception

In his Allmusic review, Bruce Eder describes Disc Two as "...where honky tonk comes into the world fully formed, with a comparatively loud, jaunty backup and Tubb's vocals acquiring the smooth, deep, emotive quality that characterized his peak performance. This disc is Ernest Tubb lean and mean, creating a popular music genre as he goes along."

Personnel
Ernest Tubb – vocals, guitar
Jerry Byrd – steel guitar 
Bill Drake – guitar  
Jack Drake – bass  
Wayne Fleming – steel guitar  
Ray "Kemo" Head – steel guitar
Herbert M. Paige – bass, guitar
Charlie Quirk – guitar
Johnny Sapp – fiddle  
Melvin Leon Short – guitar
Merwyn J. Buffington – guitar
Hal Smith – fiddle  
Jay Smith – guitar, steel guitar
Eddie Tudor – guitar
Zeke Turner – guitar
Wesley Tuttle – bass
Production notes:
Paul Cohen – producer
Dave Kapp – producer
Eli Oberstein – producer
Joe Perry – producer
Richard Weize – liner notes, reissue producer, research
Steve Lasker – research, disc transfers, metal transfers
Alan Stoker – research, disc transfers, metal transfers
Ronnie Pugh Liner Notes, Discography, Biographical Information
Adam Skeaping – mastering
Kevin Coffey – photography, illustrations
R.A. Andreas – photography, illustrations
Jerry Strobel – photography, illustrations
Elaine Tubb – photography, illustrations
Sylke Holtrop – artwork, illustrations
Gerd Weiler – artwork, illustrations
Richard Ihnaton Wiez – discography  
Larry Zwisohn – liner notes, discography

References

1996 compilation albums
Ernest Tubb compilation albums
Bear Family Records compilation albums